Mohar Singh (1926 or 1927 – May 5, 2020) was a former dacoit bandit turned political leader. He was one of the most dreaded dacoits of the Chambal valley in the 1960s. Singh had 315 cases against him, of which 85 were murder cases.

Criminal career and life 
He had become a dacoit after murdering a man over a property dispute in the year 1955. Mohar Singh carried a reward of 3 Lakh rupees on his head in the late 1960s and '70s. He surrendered in front of  Jayaprakash Narayan in 1972 along with his gang of over 150 dacoits. 

At the time of his surrender, as part of the negotiation, he was promised that he would not be given a death sentence and was kept in an open prison. He was given agricultural land by the government as a means of livelihood.

Politics  
After serving eight years in prison Mohar Singh was released in 1980 and entered into local politics. He was elected unopposed in a local body election in 1995. He was elected to Mehgaon municipality and served as a councilor for two terms in the 1990s. He was associated with Indian National Congress, he later supported Bharatiya Janata Party in Madhya Pradesh. 

In September 2019, Singh had written a letter to the prime minister Narendra Modi for the restoration of the Bateswara temple, a historic structure, which was constructed by the Gurjara-Pratiharas.

Death 
He died on 5th May 2020 at the age of 92. He was survived by his two sons and a daughter.

In popular culture 
Mohar Singh starred in a 1982 Hindi film named, Chambal Ke Daku, which marketed with the tagline: 'first time real dacoits on-screen'.

In May 2006, it was reported that a film named Pakad was being made, featuring three dacoits Malkhan Singh, Man Singh and Mohar Singh and the story was reported to be written by M. C. Dwivedi, former chief of police of Uttar Pradesh.

See also 
 Chambal Ke Daku

References

External links
 

Indian robbers
Indian people convicted of murder
Indian film actors
1920s births

Year of birth uncertain

2020 deaths
People from Madhya Pradesh